Riders of the Rockies is a 1937 American Western film directed by Robert North Bradbury and written by Robert Emmett Tansey and Norman Leslie. The film stars Tex Ritter, Louise Stanley, Horace Murphy, Snub Pollard, Earl Dwire and Charles King. The film was released on July 2, 1937, by Grand National Films Inc.

Despite the song and title, the film takes place on the Arizona/Mexico border and not the Rockies.

Plot
Arizona Rangers Tex Rand, Doc Thornton and Pee Wee McDougal are posted to the border post at Desert Wells to combat a group of rustlers taking cattle across the Mexican border. The rustlers manage to falsely implicate the three for being in cahoots with the rustlers, leading to their arrest. Tex and the others break jail to team up with the Ruraless to bring justice to both nations.

Cast          
Tex Ritter as Tex Rand
Louise Stanley as Louise Rogers
Horace Murphy as Doc Thornton
Snub Pollard as Pee Wee McDougall
Earl Dwire as Jeff Jeffries
Charles King as Butch Regan
Yakima Canutt as Sergeant Beef
Martin Garralaga as Captain Mendoza
Jack Rockwell as Captain Reyes

References

External links
 

1937 films
1930s English-language films
American Western (genre) films
1937 Western (genre) films
Grand National Films films
Films directed by Robert N. Bradbury
American black-and-white films
1930s American films